María Elia Cabañas Aparicio is a Mexican politician affiliated with the PRI. She currently serves as Deputy of the LXII Legislature of the Mexican Congress representing Baja California.

References

Living people
Women members of the Chamber of Deputies (Mexico)
Institutional Revolutionary Party politicians
21st-century Mexican politicians
21st-century Mexican women politicians
Year of birth missing (living people)
Deputies of the LXII Legislature of Mexico
Members of the Chamber of Deputies (Mexico) for Baja California